Beno Udrih (born July 5, 1982) is a Slovenian former professional basketball player who serves as a player development coach for the New Orleans Pelicans. He previously played in the NBA for the San Antonio Spurs, Sacramento Kings, Milwaukee Bucks, Orlando Magic, New York Knicks, Memphis Grizzlies, Miami Heat and Detroit Pistons. During his time with the Spurs, Udrih won two NBA titles in 2005 and 2007.

Early career
Udrih made his professional debut with a brief stint in the Slovenian Second Basketball League in 1997, followed by three seasons in the Slovenian Basketball League. He was named the 2000 Slovenian League Rookie of the Year, and has played for the senior Slovenian national team since that same year. He played for Union Olimpija, from 2000 to 2002, where he made great improvements, and played in the EuroLeague for the first time. 

Udrih played for Maccabi Tel Aviv (Israel) in the 2002–2003 season. He split the 2003–2004 season between Avtodor Saratov (Russia) and Olimpia Milano (Italy).

Prior to his NBA debut, he appeared in the Southern California Summer Pro League for the Spurs, and also in three games with the Spurs squad in the 2004 Reebok Rocky Mountain Revue, averaging 10.3 points, 5 assists, 4.7 rebounds and 1.3 steals in 24.7 minutes per game.

Professional career

San Antonio Spurs (2004–2007)
Udrih signed with the San Antonio Spurs in the summer of 2004 after being drafted with the 28th overall pick of the 2004 NBA draft, signing a 3-year, US$2.4 million contract, and served as a key backup for starting point guard Tony Parker. In Udrih's rookie season, he won a Rookie of the Month award. Following that achievement, he was selected for the Rookie Team for the Rookie Challenge during All Star Weekend. In the 2005 NBA playoffs he won the championship with the Spurs. However, Udrih's playing time dropped significantly in the 2005–06 season with the Spurs signing Nick Van Exel during the off-season, but increased again after the All-Star break due to an injury to Van Exel's elbow. In the following 2006–07 NBA season and playoffs (where the Spurs won another NBA championship) his minutes were very limited, as the Spurs signed veteran point guard Jacque Vaughn to back up Tony Parker.

Sacramento Kings (2007–2011)
On October 27, 2007, Udrih was sent, along with cash considerations, by the Spurs to the Minnesota Timberwolves in exchange for a protected 2008 second-round draft pick. The Wolves immediately waived him. He was later signed by the Sacramento Kings as a fill in for starting point guard Mike Bibby, who was out with an injured thumb for an estimated two months. He stepped up well in his new role as starting point guard, scoring a career-high of 27 points on November 26, 2007 in a 112–99 win against his former team, the San Antonio Spurs. He averaged 12.8 points, 4.3 assists, 3.3 rebounds in 32 minutes per game in 65 games with the Kings in 2007–08.

On July 1, 2008, Udrih agreed to a 5-year contract with the Sacramento Kings after being courted by the Los Angeles Clippers.

Milwaukee Bucks (2011–2013)
On June 23, 2011, he was traded to the Milwaukee Bucks as part of a three-way deal among the Sacramento Kings and Charlotte Bobcats.

Orlando Magic (2013)
On February 21, 2013, Udrih was traded at the trade deadline to the Orlando Magic along with Tobias Harris and Doron Lamb in exchange for J. J. Redick, Gustavo Ayon, and Ish Smith.

New York Knicks (2013–2014)

On August 8, 2013, Udrih signed a one-year deal with the New York Knicks worth $1.27 million. On February 24, 2014, he was waived by the Knicks after they bought out his contract.

Memphis Grizzlies (2014–2015)
On February 27, 2014, Udrih was claimed off waivers by the Memphis Grizzlies. On July 15, 2014, Udrih re-signed with the Grizzlies to a multi-year deal.

Miami Heat (2015–2016)
On November 10, 2015, Udrih was traded, along with Jarnell Stokes, to the Miami Heat in exchange for Mario Chalmers and James Ennis. Two days later, he made his debut for the Heat in a 92–91 win over the Utah Jazz, recording two points, three rebounds and one assist in 17 minutes off the bench. On February 24, 2016, he was ruled out for three months after requiring surgery for a torn plantar plate in his right foot. He was subsequently waived by the Heat five days later.

Udrih re-signed with the Heat on August 17, 2016, but was waived on October 22 prior to the start of the 2016–17 regular season.

Detroit Pistons (2016–2017)
On October 24, 2016, Udrih was claimed off waivers by the Detroit Pistons. He re-signed with the Pistons on September 25, 2017, but was waived on October 14, 2017 prior to the start of the 2017–18 season.

Žalgiris Kaunas (2017–2018)
On December 24, 2017, Udrih returned to Europe, signing with the Lithuanian club Žalgiris Kaunas until the end of the season.

On November 27, 2021, Udrih officially announced his retirement.

Coaching career
On January 25, 2020, it was reported that Udrih had been hired by the Westchester Knicks as assistant coach. On November 16, 2020, the New Orleans Pelicans announced that they hired Udrih as player development coach.

Career statistics

NBA

Regular season

|-
| style="text-align:left;background:#afe6ba;" | †
| align="left" | San Antonio
| 80 || 2 || 14.4 || .444 || .408 || .753 || 1.0 || 1.9 || .5 || .1 || 5.9
|-
| align="left" | 
| align="left" | San Antonio
| 55 || 3 || 10.7 || .455 || .343 || .780 || 1.0 || 1.7 || .3 || .0 || 5.1
|-
| style="text-align:left;background:#afe6ba;" | †
| align="left" | San Antonio
| 73 || 1 || 13.0 || .369 || .287 || .883 || 1.1 || 1.7 || .4 || .0 || 4.7
|-
| align="left" | 
| align="left" | Sacramento
| 65 || 51 || 32.0 || .463 || .387 || .850 || 3.3 || 4.3 || .9 || .2 || 12.8
|-
| align="left" | 
| align="left" | Sacramento
| 73 || 72 || 31.1 || .461 || .310 || .820 || 3.0 || 4.7 || 1.1 || .2 || 11.0
|-
| align="left" | 
| align="left" | Sacramento
| 79 || 41 || 31.4 || .493 || .377 || .837 || 2.8 || 4.7 || 1.1 || .1 || 12.9
|-
| align="left" | 
| align="left" | Sacramento
| 79 || 64 || 34.6 || .500 || .357 || .864 || 3.4 || 4.9 || 1.2 || .1 || 13.7
|-
| align="left" | 
| align="left" | Milwaukee
| 59 || 0 || 18.3 || .440 || .288 || .709 || 1.7 || 3.8 || .6 || .0 || 5.9
|-
| align="left" | 
| align="left" | Milwaukee
| 39 || 0 || 18.4 || .475 || .265 || .727 || 2.0 || 3.5 || .4 || .1 || 6.7
|-
| align="left" | 
| align="left" | Orlando
| 27 || 9 || 27.3 || .408 || .396 || .857 || 2.3 || 6.1 || .9 || .0 || 10.2
|-
| style="text-align:left;"| 
| style="text-align:left;"| New York
| 31 || 12 || 19.0 || .425 || .425 || .833 || 1.8 || 3.5 || .7 || .1 || 5.6
|-
| style="text-align:left;"| 
| style="text-align:left;"| Memphis
| 10 || 0 || 5.5 || .556 || 1.000 || .833 || .2 || .6 || .1 || .1 || 2.7
|-
| style="text-align:left;"| 
| style="text-align:left;"| Memphis
| 79 || 12 || 18.9 || .487 || .268 || .853 || 1.8 || 2.6 || .6 || .1 || 7.7
|-
| style="text-align:left;"| 
| style="text-align:left;"| Memphis
| 8 || 0 || 15.0 || .435 || .364 || 1.000 || 1.1 || 3.3 || .4 || .1 || 5.9
|-
| style="text-align:left;"| 
| style="text-align:left;"| Miami
| 36 || 5 || 16.3 || .434 || .333 || .882 || 1.8 || 2.5 || .3 || 0 || 4.4
|-
| style="text-align:left;"| 
| style="text-align:left;"| Detroit
| 39 || 0 || 14.4 || .467 || .344 || .941 || 1.5 || 3.4 || .3 || 0 || 5.8
|- class="sortbottom"
| style="text-align:center;" colspan="2"| Career
| 831 || 272 || 21.9 || .463 || .349 || .833 || 2.1 || 3.4 || .7 || .1 || 8.4

Playoffs

|-
| style="text-align:left;background:#afe6ba;" | 2005†
| align="left" | San Antonio
| 21 || 0 || 11.5 || .359 || .270 || .857 || .8 || 1.0 || .4 || .0 || 3.7
|-
| align="left" | 2006
| align="left" | San Antonio
| 7 || 0 || 6.7 || .333 || .167 || .800 || .6 || 1.1 || .0 || .0 || 3.6
|-
| style="text-align:left;background:#afe6ba;" | 2007†
| align="left" | San Antonio
| 8 || 0 || 2.5 || .000 || .000 || 1.000 || .1 || .1 || .0 || .0 || .3
|-
| align="left" | 2014
| align="left" | Memphis
| 7 || 0 || 16.4 || .467 || .333 || .692 || 1.7|| 1.7 || .4 || .0 || 7.9
|-
| align="left" | 2015
| align="left" | Memphis
| 10 || 0 || 17.5 || .425 || .250'|| .833 || 2.0 || 2.1 || .5 || .0 || 7.6
|- class="sortbottom"
| style="text-align:center;" colspan="2"| Career
| 43 || 0 || 11.3 || .388 || .260 || .804 || 1.0 || 1.2 || .3 || .0 || 4.5

EuroLeague

|-
| style="text-align:left;"| 2000–01
| style="text-align:left;" rowspan=2| Union Olimpija
| 13 || 0 || 24.6 || .411 || .250 || .593 || 2.2 || 2.2 || 1.2 || .1 || 7.2 || 5.6
|-
| style="text-align:left;"| 2001–02
| 19 || 9 || 27.3 || .478 || .339 || .766 || 2.5 || 2.6 || 1.8 || .1 || 10.8 || 10.8
|-
| style="text-align:left;"| 2002–03
| style="text-align:left;"| Maccabi
| 20 || 16 || 24.3 || .466 || .269 || .806 || 1.9 || 2.8 || 1.3 || .1 || 8.3 || 9.4
|-
| style="text-align:left;"| 2017–18
| style="text-align:left;"| Žalgiris
| 17 || 0 || 17.4 || .411 || .250 || .500 || 1.5 || 1.8 || .4 || .0 || 3.1 || 3.0
|- class="sortbottom"
| style="text-align:left;"| Career
| style="text-align:left;"|
| 69 || 25 || 22.0|| .462 || .300 || .733 || 2.0 || 2.4 || 1.2 || .1 || 7.5 || 7.5

Personal life
Udrih comes from a family of basketball players. His father, Silvo, played for Zlatorog Laško, and his brother, Samo Udrih, is also a professional basketball player.

See also
 
 List of European basketball players in the United States

References

External links

 Beno Udrih at euroleague.net
 

1982 births
Living people
2006 FIBA World Championship players
ABA League players
BC Avtodor Saratov players
BC Žalgiris players
Detroit Pistons players
Israeli Basketball Premier League players
KK Olimpija players
Maccabi Tel Aviv B.C. players
Memphis Grizzlies players
Miami Heat players
Milwaukee Bucks players
National Basketball Association players from Slovenia
New York Knicks players
Olimpia Milano players
Orlando Magic players
Point guards
Sacramento Kings players
San Antonio Spurs draft picks
San Antonio Spurs players
Slovenian expatriate basketball people in Israel
Slovenian expatriate basketball people in Italy
Slovenian expatriate basketball people in Russia
Slovenian expatriate basketball people in the United States
Slovenian men's basketball players
Sportspeople from Celje